Sridhar was an Indian actor in the Tamil film industry. He has acted about 150 films and he was introduced to Tamil cinema as a child artist. He was famous for his child performance in many movies and so called as Master Sridhar.

Personal life
Sridhar married actress Indira aka Baby Indira and she was also a famous child artist in 70s movies. The couple have two sons named Prashanth and Rakshith. He was residing with his family in his residence in Chennai Kottivaakkam Karpagamabal Nagar.

Film career
Beginning his career as a child artist, Sridhar acted in many films, including Kandan Karunai, Karnan, Swamy Ayyappan. He proved his mettle in social genre too cast as hero in K.S. Gopalakrishnan's Kurathi Magan, starring Gemini Ganesan and K.R. Vijaya. He was well known with his gracious performance as Lord Muruga in the classic old movie Kandan Karunai.

Adi Parasakthi (Raj TV), Gnyaanaanandham (Podhigai) and Indrajith (Jaya TV) were some of the serials in which he was featured.

His last film in Tamil was 2007 released Bhagavan Ayyappan.

Partial filmography

Death
He had asthma for long period and died on 11 December 2013 morning due to sudden heart attack. He is survived by his wife Baby Indira and sons Prashanth and Rakshit Balaji.

References

External links 
 

Date of birth missing
Place of birth missing
Male actors in Tamil cinema
2013 deaths
1953 births